Alcorn is an unincorporated community in Claiborne County, Mississippi, United States. It is the common name given to sites without a name but are around or close to Alcorn State University. Alcorn State University is officially in Lorman, Mississippi by zip code in Jefferson County, Mississippi. A post office operated under the name Alcorn from 1906 to 1954.

Alcorn is the location of four places listed on the National Register of Historic Places:

 Bethel Presbyterian Church
 Canemount
 Catledge Archeological Site
 Oakland Chapel (on the Alcorn State University campus)

References

Unincorporated communities in Claiborne County, Mississippi
Unincorporated communities in Mississippi